The women's competition in the heavyweight (– 75 kg) division was held on 22 and 23 September 2010.

Schedule

Medalists

Records

Results

New records

References
(Page 51) Start List
Results

- Women's 75 kg, 2010 World Weightlifting Championships
2010 in women's weightlifting